St Peter's Church is the parish church of Rodmell, East Sussex, England, and dates from the 12th century. It is a Grade I listed building and is among the earliest surviving examples of Norman architecture in the country.

Gallery

References

External links

Parochial Church Council - Parish of St Peter, Rodmell
Sussex Parish Churches - St Peter, Rodmell

12th-century church buildings in England
Church of England church buildings in East Sussex
Grade I listed buildings in East Sussex
Grade I listed churches in East Sussex